"Mogwai Fear Satan" (sometimes referred to as "Fear Satan") is an instrumental by Scottish post-rock group Mogwai. It appears as the closing track for their 1997 debut studio album, Mogwai Young Team.

Overview
"Mogwai Fear Satan" is a 16-minute instrumental, using basic rock instrumentation: guitars, bass, and drums, along with flute. The origin of the song title stems from bassist Dominic Aitchison’s, the only religious member of Mogwai, fear of the Devil, due to his Catholic upbringing.

Musical composition
"Mogwai Fear Satan" begins with a guitar melody riff consisting of three chords by Stuart Braithwaite and John Cummings, which is soon joined by bass played by Dominic Aitchison and a frantic drumbeat played by Martin Bulloch, which gradually fades in. The same guitar riff is repeated throughout the song, at times heavily distorted. During the quiet parts of the song, in the buildup to the explosion of sound and feedback which Mogwai are known for, there is a quiet flute melody played by Shona Brown (who was thirteen at the time of recording) over tribal-sounding drums. The song slowly fades out into feedback and noise.

Media usage

 In 2002, a short excerpt of "Mogwai Fear Satan" was featured in "Eddie Kidd Rides Again", an episode of the documentary television program, RE:Brand, hosted by English comedian and actor, Russell Brand.
 It was also featured on soundtrack for WRC 4, The Official Game of the FIA World Rally Championship on PlayStation 2.
 Manic Street Preachers used the song as the intro music for their 2005 Past Present Future tour of the UK.
 Repeatedly referred to in Christopher Brookmyre's book Pandaemonium where a 28-minute remix has been created by some of the schoolchildren and played at a school dance.
 Part of the song was used in the 2007 documentary The 11th Hour.
 A remix version of the song is used in the 2003 film All the Real Girls.

Remixes

There are five official remixes of "Mogwai Fear Satan". The EP  Mogwai Fear Satan Remixes (released in March, 1998) includes the Mogwai Remix, the μ-Ziq Remix, the Surgeon Remix, and the My Bloody Valentine Remix. The remix album Kicking a Dead Pig (released in May, 1998) features the Mogwai Remix, LP Version. A later re-issue of Kicking a Dead Pig included Mogwai Fear Satan Remixes on a separate CD.

Both versions of the Mogwai Remix are remixed by "Cpt. Meat and pLasmatroN" (John Cummings and Stuart Braithwaite).

Personnel
 Stuart Braithwaite – guitar
 Dominic Aitchison – bass guitar
 John Cummings – guitar
 Martin Bulloch – drums
 Shona Brown – flute
 Paul Savage – producer, mixer

References

Mogwai songs
1997 songs
Rock instrumentals
Songs written by Stuart Braithwaite
Songs written by Dominic Aitchison